Matti Ossian Wuori (July 16, 1945 in Helsinki – October 15, 2005) was a Finnish lawyer, politician, and Member of the European Parliament (MEP) for the Green League in 1999–2004.

His father died early which left his mother to raise him while running a kiosk. Wuori graduated from the University of Helsinki and became active in cultural and political movements since the late 1960s. He reported annually about the state of international human rights during his term in the European Parliament.

Wuori was the chairman of Greenpeace Finland, 1989–1998, and Greenpeace International, 1991–1991.

Wuori died after a long battle with cancer.

Trivia
Wuori had a cameo role in Aki Kaurismäki's film The Man Without a Past. He loved cigars and owned many ties.

References

External links
http://www.mattiwuori.net/ (not working anymore)

Green League politicians
1945 births
2005 deaths
Politicians from Helsinki
Deaths from cancer in Finland
Green League MEPs
MEPs for Finland 1999–2004
People associated with Greenpeace
20th-century Finnish lawyers